The 2019 Australian Women in Music Awards was the second Australian Women in Music Awards. The event took place on 9 October 2019. 15 award categories were presented, including new awards for Excellence in Classical Music, Excellence in Image Making and Music Journalism. The Educator Award, Auriel Andrew Memorial Award and Musical Excellence Award were retired.

AWMA Honour Roll
 Judith Durham

Nominees and winners

AWMA Awards
Winners indicated in boldface, with other nominees in plain.

References

External links
 

2019 in Australian music
2019 music awards